Siah Jamegan Football Club (Bashgah-e Futbal-e Siah Jamigan) is an Iranian football club based in Mashhad, Iran. They used to play in the Persian Gulf Pro League. In August 2011 the club bought the license of second division side Golchin Robat Karim. Siah Jamegan is an offshoot and has the roots of heavily supported club Aboomoslem, sharing the same colours and kit.

On 28 April 2015, the club earned promotion to the Persian Gulf Pro League for the first time in the club's history.

History

Establishment
In August 2011, Siah Jamegan Football Club was founded in Mashhad and was placed in the 2nd Division. In 2013, team were promoted to the Azadegan League. That following year Siah Jamegan finished second in their group and were placed in the promotion play-off. Siah Jamegan lost to Paykan 3–1 in the play-off and failed to be promoted to the Iran Pro League.

Success years
In August 2014, Siah Jamegan announced that they had bought Aboomoslem and will play in the Azadegan League under the name and logo of Aboomoslem, but the deal later fell through.

Persian Gulf Pro League
Siah Jamegan performed excellently in the 2014–15 season and for the first team in club history, the team was promoted to the Persian Gulf Pro League. They also competed in the final of the Azadegan League against Foolad Novin, but lost 1–0.

On 30 July 2015, Siah Jamegan lost its first ever Persian Gulf Pro League game 2–0 to Tehran club Esteghlal. After week four Rasoul Khatibi resigned as manager and was replaced by Saeed Ramezani. After a poor season, Meshki Pooshan Khorasan escaped relegation on the last day after beating Malavan 2–0.

Siah Jamegan's form did not improve in the 2016–17 season, they spent the season near the bottom of the table and only escaped relegation on the last day after beating league champions Persepolis 1–0. But the following season Siah Jamegan relegated to Azadegan League.

Stadium
Takhti Stadium is the home stadium for Meshki Pooshan Khorasan. It can hold 15,000 spectators.

Current Technical Staff

Players

First-team squad
As of March 31, 2018

For recent transfers, see List of Iranian football transfers summer 2017''.

Loan list

Head coaches
 Seyed Kazem Ghiyassian (September 2011)
 Armin Rahbar (October 2011)
 Mohammad Reza Mohajeri (October 2011 – June 2015)
 Rasoul Khatibi (June 2015 – August 2015)
 Saeed Ramezani (August 2015 – September 2015)
 Farhad Kazemi (September 2015 – October 2016)
 Khodadad Azizi (October 2016 – February 2017)
 Akbar Misaghian (February 2017 – October 2017)
 Alireza Marzban (October 2017 – December 2017)
 Reza Enayati (December 2017 – March 2018)
 Davoud Mahabadi (March 2018 to July 2018)
 Ali Hanteh (July 2018 to September 2018)
 Hamidreza Zohani (September 2018 to Present)

Season-by-season

The table below shows the achievements of the club in various competitions.

References

External links
 Official site

See also
 2013–14 Hazfi Cup
 2013–14 Azadegan League

Football clubs in Iran
Association football clubs established in 2011
Sport in Mashhad